Andrew E. Steinmann is Distinguished Professor of Theology and Hebrew at Concordia University Chicago. He has authored a dozen books and numerous articles relating to Old Testament/Hebrew Bible, Biblical Hebrew, and Biblical Aramaic. His publications include books on the Old Testament canon, biblical chronology, Hebrew and Aramaic grammar, and commentaries on several Old Testament books.

Biography
Steinmann attended the University of Cincinnati, graduating with a B. S. in Chemical Engineering. He pursued studies to enter the ministry of the Lutheran Church–Missouri Synod, receiving a M. Div. from Concordia Theological Seminary in Ft. Wayne, Indiana. Subsequently he served as Associate Pastor of St. John Lutheran Church, Fraser, Michigan, and later assistant professor at Concordia University in Ann Arbor, Michigan. During this time he received a PhD in Near Eastern Studies at the University of Michigan. Steinmann was translation coordinator for the God's Word Translation of the Bible, and currently serves on the Translation Oversight Committee for the Christian Standard Bible. He also served as staff pastor at Lutheran Home in Westlake, Ohio, before he accepted his present position at Concordia University Chicago.

Steinmann serves as a regular guest on the radio programs "Issues, Etc." and "The Bible Study" on KFUO in St. Louis, and has also been a guest on "Our World, His View" on WLQV in Detroit and "Studio A" on KFUO.

Major publications

In The Oracles of God: The Old Testament Canon, Steinmann reviewed the evidence for the history of the compilation and organization of the Hebrew Bible. Among his major conclusions were that the canon existed as a collection from before the time of Christ, that it was originally considered to be a collection of authoritative and divinely inspired books kept in the temple in Jerusalem, and that the later Jewish and Christian organizations of the canon were developments from a more simple two-part organization of Law (Pentateuch) and Prophets.

Steinmann has also published several works relating to chronology of the Bible, especially From Abraham to Paul: A Biblical Chronology. He has challenged the consensus on the date of the death of Herod the Great, arguing that Herod died in 1 BC (Steinmann, Andrew. "When Did Herod the Great Reign?", Novum Testamentum, Volume 51, Number 1, 2009, pp. 1–29). With Rodger Young he has also argued that the source of the information on the Parian Chronicle was most likely the city records of Athens.

Publications

Books

Edited by

Journal articles

References

External links
 Andrew Steinmann

1954 births
Writers from Cincinnati
Living people
Educators from Cincinnati
University of Cincinnati alumni
University of Michigan alumni
Concordia University Chicago people
American biblical scholars
Concordia Theological Seminary alumni
Old Testament scholars
American Lutheran theologians
21st-century American Lutheran clergy
Lutheran Church–Missouri Synod people
Lutheran biblical scholars
20th-century American Lutheran clergy